So far, there are more than 150 Pashto language universities in Afghanistan. Of these, 37 are public and the rest are private.

List of Pashto language universities by provinces of Afghanistan

Kabul Province

Kandahar Province

Khost Province

Laghman Province

Nangarhar Province

Kunar Province

Kunduz Province

Paktia Province

Other provinces

External links

References

Pashto
Lists of universities and colleges in Asia